St Joseph's Boys' High School (formerly St. Joseph's European High School) is a private Catholic primary and senior secondary school located on Museum Road in Bangalore, Karnataka, India. Founded by the MEP (French Missionaries) in 1858, the school caters to boys only from kindergarten to Grade 10 and is co-educational in Grades 11 and 12. 

The school's Annual Old Boys Day draws alumni from around the globe. The school's history is detailed by alumnus Christopher Rego in the book "Faith and Toil".

History

St Joseph's Boys' High School, Bangalore was founded by the MEP French Fathers in 1858 to offer a liberal education for the boys of European/Anglo and Anglo-Indian families. After India's independence, admission was extended in the 1950s and 1960s to include all students, irrespective of race, religion, or caste. The school buildings are situated in the center of the (formerly European quarter of the) city. Originally the upper floors provided dormitory space.

Large, open playgrounds accommodate sports such as cricket, football, and hockey. and other games and forms of exercise. The cricket team trains at the Centenary Ground located on Mahatma Gandhi Road near the Mayo Hall. The school pays great attention to physical training and sports and has long conducted the Annual Hockey Tournament for ICSE schools in Bangalore. Sports rivalries have been strong since the mid-19th century. The school hosts a Cadet Platoon, a Boy Scout Troop, and Debating and Literary Societies for the higher classes.

In 1883, when Father J.M. Vissac was rector, the school was situated on St. John's Hill at the current location of St. Germain High School, adjoining St Francis Xavier's Cathedral. Vissac relocated the school to a large campus in the heart of the City Cantonment. He purchased the "Rocklands" property adjacent to the Madras Bank (the present State Bank of India) and the Good Shepherd Convent and designed the buildings on Museum Road in 1894. In 1898, 100 boarders and 89 day scholars moved to the new facility.

By 1913 the school had grown to 239 boarders and 183 day scholars, and two new blocks were added along with an immense playground called "New Fields" on Vittal Mallya Road. The tract had to be drained for the playing fields. In 1910, the school adopted the High School Examination System giving up the Old Matriculation System and is believed to have at this time adopted the name St Joseph's European High School. The University meanwhile had abolished the F.A. and replaced it with the Intermediate Arts Exam.

Fr. Vissac had two French priests from the diocese, Frs. Froger and Schmitt, earn their MA from the University of London, England, and they returned to teach. After 20 years Fr. Vissac handed over the reins to Fr. Froger, Rector from 1903 to 1913, and again from 1915 to 1916. Fr. Froger also did the oil paintings on the walls of the priests' and boarders' refectories.

In the first half of the 20th century, the school curriculum was directed toward the Government High and Middle School Examinations, the Cambridge School Certificate, and the Junior and Preliminary Examinations. The School was recognized by Cambridge University and senior candidates could obtain Certificate A of the General Certificate of Education (GCE). The boys prepared for Preliminary Cambridge in Std. VI, for the Middle School in Std. VII, for Junior Cambridge in Std. VIII, and for the High School and Cambridge School Certificate in Std. IX.

During British rule, teachers in Anglo Indian schools had subsidized salaries that were significantly higher than at the Indian SSLC schools. With Independence in 1947, the school lost many of its earlier privileges. Continually rising exam fees of the University of Cambridge, a result of post-war inflation, coincided with a severe foreign currency crunch in India.

The Government of India, unwilling to release foreign exchange for these examinations, switched to the Indian School Certificate Council, with two examinations at the end of Classes X and XII, the  Indian Certificate of Secondary Education (ICSE) and the Indian School Certificate (ISC). 

The school follows the ICSE syllabus up to Class X. In 2005 the school expanded its curriculum at both ends. It added Classes I through IV and extended the high school to include the ISC at Class XII. The year 2007 included another first: Class XI was expanded to include girls. Today there are about 60 students per section and three sections in the middle and high school. The other classes have fewer students.

Another major change over the years was the closing of the in-school boarding house, which had housed boys ages 8 to 16 in three separate dormitories. They were allowed one out-of-school outing on the last Saturday each month. Their health was entrusted to a Medical Officer and matrons in a large infirmary with a special room for infectious diseases. A monthly lantern lecture addressed various educational topics and on special occasions, drama, music, and cinema shows were screened in the School Hall.

Construction of the new school building took from 2001 until 2007, under Fr. Michael John, the principal from 1994 to 2006. The new facilities, along with improvements, offer a modern and aesthetic environment while retaining from British India the Roman Catholic chapel, the refectory, and the priests' residence.

The Society of Jesus connection 

As early as 1841 Bishop Bonnaud planned to start a Catholic High school in Bangalore. But this proposal took concrete shape only in 1854 when the priests of the Missions étrangères de Paris (MEP) bought a plot of land for a sum of INR 1000 at St. Johns Hill. Bangalore. Fr. Bouteloup had a house constructed in 1854 at a cost of INR 3000 and named it St Joseph's Seminary. It also contained an orphanage and boarding school.

Madras University was established in 1858 and boarders were admitted to prepare for the matriculation examination there. Fr. Charbonnaux, in charge of the school at the time, entered in his diary: "We decided to open a school for European boys. As a knowledge of English is necessary to our Indian pupils and that of Canarese to European boys we determined to build a wing and a kitchen adjoining the Seminary." This was the beginning of St Joseph's College. In the nomenclature of the day, in European usage a college was what today would be called a high school and what would today be called a college would be termed University. By May 1865 a new house was built to take in the orphans and boarders of the school.

It was difficult for the three departments, seminary, orphanage, and school to function in the same building. Hence in 1875 the orphanage was transferred to St Patrick's Church, where it still exists as St Patrick's Orphanage. The Seminary closed and its buildings were utilized for the school and boarding house. The school had 144 students – 64 boarders and 80 day scholars.

In 1882 the new rector, Fr. Maurice Vissac, had the school affiliated to Madras University as a second-grade college that could prepare and send students for the F.A. (First Arts) exams. In 1884, the first two candidates appeared for this exam and qualified.

During and immediately after World War I the French Fathers (MEP) found it difficult to staff the school. The devastation of World War I had destroyed nearly a generation of men, some of whom would have become priests and joined the MEP. Bishop Despastures of Mysore, under whose jurisdiction Bangalore came at the time, sought to free up his priests and get religious to teach. He sought unsuccessfully to get the Canons of St Maurice from Switzerland but did get orders of teaching brothers. He had earlier approached the Society of Jesus (Jesuits), founded by St. Ignatius Loyola. He now got the Jesuit Father General in Rome to send a visitor, Fr. Van Kalken, who, in February 1937, wrote to the Superior of the Jesuit Mission in Mangalore that Fr. General had accepted the offer of the Bishop of Mysore. 

If the Mangalore mission of the Jesuits could not provide sufficient Jesuits then the Visitor would invite Jesuits from other Indian missions to offer their services for this work. All St Joseph's institutions – St Joseph's European High School, St Joseph's Indian High School situated at the "New Fields" grounds on Vittal Mallya Road, and St Joseph's College – were transferred to Jesuit management.

When Italy aligned itself with Hitler against the British for World War II, Italian and German priests were branded as enemy aliens and were interned. The Jesuit superiors found Fr. E.J. Jacques, an Anglo-Indian with an M.A. degree from the University of London, and Fr. Studerus, a Swiss and hence a neutral, to fill the vacancies. Later, Indian Jesuits came to manage the schools.

The Houses
The House system is a feature common to Public Schools in India, especially Christian-run schools (based on a similar system in England).

The four houses are named after the patron saints of the four constituent nations of the United Kingdom: 
 St. Andrew of Scotland – colour blue
 St. Patrick of Northern Ireland – colour green
 St. George of England – colour red
 St. David of Wales – colour yellow.

The houses compete with one another in academics, games, track and field sports, aquatics, arts, and literary, dramatic, and music competitions.

School motto and school song
The motto of the school is Fide et Labore. The music of the school song was composed by Rev. G. Leroy.
         
Ring out the battle call of Duty!
Unfurl the flag of Faith and Toil!
We deem our soul's eternal beauty
A lifelong Victor's worthy spoil
A thousand such have proudly gone before us
To win and spread our School's renown:
'Tis ours to swell with our voices the chorus 
And with our deeds enrich her crown.
 
Faith and Toil, conquerless alliance
Wherein we clasp human hands unto God's!
In His control find we true self-reliance;
My hand and God's – Whate'er the odds
My hand and God's – Whate'er the odds
My hand and God's
Evil's onset hold in defiance !

Notable alumni

 T.S.Krishnamurthy – Chief Election Commissioner of India
 Kumar Anish – famous yoga practitioner and the developer of the concept of GOPI Formula in yoga
 Ashish Ballal – Indian national hockey team
 Krishna Bharath – creator of Google News
 Sabeer Bhatia – co-founder of Hotmail
 Sandeep Dikshit – MP from East Delhi constituency
 Rahul Dravid – former captain of the Indian cricket team
 Rajeev Gowda – spokesperson for the Indian National Congress, professor of economics and social sciences at Indian Institute of Management Bangalore
 Mariappa Kempaiah – Olympian Indian footballer – 1956 Melbourne and 1960 Rome Olympics
 Tarun Khanna – Jorge Paulo Lemann Professor at the Harvard Business School
 Sudhir Krishnaswamy – Rhodes Scholar; Vice-Chancellor of National Law School of India University, Bangalore
 Thomas Kurian – CEO of Google Cloud
 George Kurian – CEO of NetApp
 Chetan Maini – founder Reva Electric Car Company
 Mario Miranda – cartoonist and Padma Bhushan awardee
 Devdutt Padikkal – cricketer for the Indian under-19s, Royal Challengers Bangalore , and Karnataka teams
 J. Y. Pillay – Singaporean bureaucrat and former chairman of Singapore Airlines and Singapore Exchange
 Rehan Poncha – represented India in the 2008 Summer Olympics in Beijing
 Prakash Raj – film artist in Sandalwood, Kollywood, Tollywood, and Bollywood
 Rahul Sarpeshkar – professor of electrical engineering and computer science at the Massachusetts Institute of Technology
 Subir Sachdev – professor of physics at Harvard University specializing in condensed matter
 Anup Sridhar – India's former national badminton champion; represented India at 2008 Beijing Olympics
 Shavir Tarapore – international ODI and T20 cricket umpire
 Robin Uthappa – Indian cricket team

See also

 List of Jesuit schools
 List of schools in Bangalore
 Violence against Christians in India

References

External links  
 

Jesuit secondary schools in India
Jesuit primary schools in India
Boys' schools in India
Christian schools in Karnataka
Primary schools in Karnataka
High schools and secondary schools in Bangalore
Educational institutions established in 1858
1858 establishments in India